Warszewiczia coccinea (or chaconia, wild poinsettia and pride of Trinidad and Tobago) is a species of flowering plant in the family Rubiaceae. It is the national flower of Trinidad and Tobago because it blooms on 31 August, which coincides with the day that Trinidad and Tobago became independent from the United Kingdom.

This small, evergreen ornamental tree is remarkable for its inflorescence with bright red bracts and inconspicuous yellow petals.

The anise-odored roots are said to exhibit aphrodisiac properties.

A cultivar, the double chaconia, which has a double row of bracts, is the more widely cultivated form. This plant originates from cuttings taken from a wild plant found growing along a roadside. Since propagation from seed has not yet been successful, all double chaconias have been propagated by cuttings from this individual.

References

External links

 World Checklist of Rubiaceae
 News.gov.tt: The National Flower

Rondeletieae
Flora of the Caribbean
National symbols of Trinidad and Tobago
Flora of Central America
Flora of South America
Flora without expected TNC conservation status